Silt'e is a zone in the Southern Nations, Nationalities and Peoples' Region of Ethiopia. This zone is named for the Silt'e people, whose homeland lies in this zone. Like other nationalities in Ethiopia, the Silt'e people have their own language, Silt'e. Silt'e is bordered on the south by Alaba special woreda, on the southwest by Hadiya, on the north by Gurage, and on the east by the Oromia Region.

Following a referendum held between 18 and 26 April 2001, the Silt'e unanimously voted to form their own Zone, Silt'e. Later more woredas from Gurage and Hadya zones and Alaba special woreda were added.

Hayder

Demographics 
Based on the 2007 Census conducted by the Central Statistical Agency of Ethiopia (CSA), this Zone has a total population of more than 5,250,398, of whom 2,612,696 are men and 2,637,702 women; 78,525 or 6.28% are urban inhabitants. The largest ethnic group reported in Silt'e was the Silt'e people (97.35%); all other ethnic groups made up 2.65% of the population. Silt'e is spoken as a first language by 96.95% of the population, and 1.48% spoke Amharic; the remaining 1.57% spoke all other primary languages reported. The majority of the inhabitants were reported as Muslim, with 98.2% of the population reporting that belief, while 0.08% practiced Ethiopian Orthodox Christianity.

Woredas 
Woredas of Silt'e Zone are:

 Alicho Werero
 Dalocha
 Lanfro
 Mirab Azernet Berbere
 Misraq Azernet Berbere
 Sankurra
 Silte
 Wulbareg
•  Mito 

•  Misraq Silti

•Worabe 

•Tora

•Alam gebaya 

•delocha

•kibat

References 

Southern Nations, Nationalities, and Peoples' Region
Zones of Ethiopia
Zones in Southern Nations, Nationalities, and Peoples' Region